Callamand is a surname. Notable people with the surname include:

Lucien Callamand (1888–1968), French film actor
Sébastien Callamand (born 1985), French footballer

French-language surnames